The 2004–05 season is FC Vaslui's 3rd season of its existence, and its 2nd in a row, in Divizia B. After failing in the previous season to promote, the team's objective this season, was the same. From the beginning of the championship, FC Vaslui started very well, and finished 1st, with 10 points in front of the 2nd team. And so, FC Vaslui promoted in Divizia A, for the first time in its history, this being the most important achievement in its history.

Squad 
As of 11 June 2005

Statistics

Appearances and goals
Last updated on 11 June 2005.

|-
|colspan="12"|Players sold or loaned out during the season
|-

|}

Top scorers

Top Assisters

Disciplinary record

Divizia B

League table

Results summary

Results by round

Matches

Cupa României
Kick-off listed in local time (EET)

Round 5

Round 6

FC Vaslui seasons
Vaslui